

August Treboniu Laurian (17 July 1810 – 25 February 1881) was a Transylvanian Romanian politician, historian and linguist. He was born in the village of Hochfeld, Principality of Transylvania, Austrian Empire (today Fofeldea as part of Nocrich, Romania). He was a participant in the 1848 revolution, an organizer of the Romanian school and one of the founding members of the Romanian Academy.

Laurian was a member of the Transylvanian School, a mainly-Transylvanian movement in the Romanian culture which promoted the idea that Romanians are pure Romans, whose history was a continuation of the history of the Roman Empire.

His book on History of the Romanians began with the Foundation of Rome in 753 BC and after the demise of Rome, it continues with the history of the Romanians, with all dates being converted to the Roman system, Ab urbe condita. Thus, in his book it is written that Vladimirescu's rebellion occurred in the year 2574 AUC.

Because of this alleged continuity, he supported the purification of the Romanian language by stripping it of non-Latin elements and attempting to bring it as close to Latin as possible. Between 1871 and 1876, Laurian collaborated with Ioan Massim for a two-volume Romanian language dictionary, commissioned by the Romanian Academy. The dictionary was stripped of non-Latin words, including neologisms as replacements for such words, which were supposed to be eliminated from the language. The dictionary was also written in an etymological spelling system, the result being an artificial language which only vaguely resembled Romanian and it provoked laughter, discrediting the Latinist school.

See also
Wallachian Revolution of 1848
Nicolae Bălcescu
Mihail Kogălniceanu

Notes

External links
 
Encyclopedia of 1848 Revolutions: August Treboniu Laurian

References
Lucian Boia, History and Myth in Romanian Consciousness, Budapest: Central European University Press, 2001

1810 births
1881 deaths
19th-century Romanian people
Romanian philologists
Romanian revolutionaries
Presidents of the Romanian Academy
Founding members of the Romanian Academy
Romanian Greek-Catholics
People of the Revolutions of 1848
Romanian people in the Principality of Transylvania (1711–1867)
Austrian Empire emigrants to Romania
People from Sibiu County
Burials at Bellu Cemetery
19th-century Romanian historians